Jack mackerels or saurels are marine fish in the genus Trachurus of the family Carangidae. The name of the genus derives from the Greek words trachys ("rough") and oura ("tail"). Some species, such as T. murphyi, are harvested in purse seine nets, and overfishing (harvesting beyond sustainable levels) has sometimes occurred.

It is often used in Japanese cuisine, where it is called aji, in Turkish cuisine, where it is called istavrit, and in Portuguese Cuisine, where it is called carapau.

Species

The genus Trachurus was defined in 1810 by Constantine Samuel Rafinesque-Schmaltz, who called the type species Trachurus saurus.  Taxonomists later determined that T. saurus was in fact the same species as one described earlier as Scomber trachurus, defined in 1758 by Carl Linnaeus.  Under the rules of binomial nomenclature, that species is now known as Trachurus trachurus, commonly known as the Atlantic horse mackerel.

The currently recognized species in this genus are:

References
 Fitch JE (1956) "Jack mackerel" CalCOFI Reports, 5: 27–28.

Caranginae
Extant Eocene first appearances
Taxa named by Constantine Samuel Rafinesque
Marine fish genera